The Morning Show may refer to:

Australia
 The Morning Show (TV program), an Australian talk show hosted by Larry Emdur and Kylie Gillies that airs on the Seven Network
 The Morning Show (1992 TV program), the original title for the 1992–2005 Australian morning television variety program, Good Morning Australia, that aired on Network Ten

Canada
 The Morning Show (Canadian TV program), a morning show on Global Toronto

Ireland
 The Morning Show with Sybil & Martin, an Irish television show produced by TV3

Philippines
 The Morning Show, a morning show formerly broadcast by the National Broadcasting Network and its successor, People's Television Network from 2010 to 2013 (no relation to below)
 The Morning Show, a regional morning show currently broadcast by ABS-CBN Bacolod (TV-4) (no relation to above)

United States
 The Morning Show, the original title of the talk show Live
 The Morning Show (American TV series), an Apple TV+ drama series starring Reese Witherspoon, Jennifer Aniston, and Steve Carell
 The Morning Show with Mike and Juliet, a television morning talk show produced by Fox
 The Morning Show (Minnesota Public Radio), an American morning drive-time radio program
 The DVE Morning Show, an American morning drive-time radio program broadcast on WDVE in Pittsburgh, Pennsylvania
 The Early Show, a morning news talk show broadcast by CBS from 1999 to 2012

See also
 Breakfast television
 Morning zoo